Jack Faust may refer to:

Jack Faust (attorney) (born 1932), attorney and television broadcaster in Oregon
Jack Faust (novel), a 1997 novel by American author Michael Swanwick